Euseius longicervix is a species of mite in the family Phytoseiidae.

References

longicervix
Articles created by Qbugbot
Animals described in 1983